KCWH-LD (channel 18) is a low-power television station in Lincoln, Nebraska, United States, affiliated with The CW Plus. It is owned by Gray Television alongside CBS affiliate KOLN (channel 10) and its semi-satellite KGIN (channel 11) in Grand Island, and York-licensed NBC affiliate KSNB-TV, channel 4 (which are simulcast on KGIN's second digital subchannels). The stations share studios on North 40th Street in Lincoln, where KCWH-LD's transmitter is also located.

For most of its history, KCWH-LD, under the call sign K18CD, served as a translator for KSNB-TV, whose signal was weak in Lincoln until its transmitter was moved to the KOLN tower near Beaver Crossing in 2022. In 2018, Gray converted the station into a standalone CW+ affiliate, simulcast on then-Sonlife Broadcasting Network affiliate KNHL (channel 5) in Hastings (which was acquired by Gray in 2019) and the second subchannel of Fox affiliate KIIT-CD (channel 11) in North Platte.

History
The original construction permit for a translator station on channel 18 in Lincoln was granted on January 4, 1988, and issued the call sign K18CD; the station was a translator for KSNB-TV (channel 4) in Superior. K18CD filed for a license to cover on August 9, 1999, which was granted on September 27. At the time, KSNB was a Fox affiliate, simulcast with KTVG (channel 17) in Grand Island. By 2007, K18CD was receiving its programming from KTVG instead of KSNB. The time brokerage agreement between Pappas Telecasting and KSNB's owner, Colins Broadcasting, expired on November 30, 2009. As a result, KSNB and its two translators, including K18CD, shut down on December 1. On December 19, 2011, the station converted to digital operations as K18CD-D. By then, the Colins stations were broadcasting intermittently with programming from the Three Angels Broadcasting Network.

On November 21, 2012, it was announced that Gray Television, the owners of KOLN/KGIN, would acquire KSNB for $1.25 million. The station deal included Lincoln translators K18CD and KWAZ-LP. On February 15, 2013, the FCC granted the assignment of the license to Gray, with the sale officially completed on February 25. KSNB aired programming from Antenna TV in the interim on both its main transmitter in York as well as on its digital K18CD-D and analog KWAZ-LP translators in Lincoln. The affiliation agreement with Antenna TV was exclusively intended for the station's second digital subchannel, but was carried on the primary digital channel as well while the station ownership changed hands. On April 1, 2013, the station took the MyNetworkTV affiliation previously held by the second digital subchannels of both KOLN and KGIN under the moniker "10/11 Central Nebraska." On September 2, 2013, KSNB became an affiliate of MeTV.

On June 11, 2014, Gray moved the market's NBC affiliation from Hastings-based KHAS-TV (channel 5, now KNHL) to KSNB and the second subchannels of KOLN and KGIN. KHAS' owner, Hoak Media, had recently merged with Gray, and original plans called for it to be sold to Excalibur Broadcasting to satisfy duopoly rules. Gray would have operated the station under a local marketing agreement. However, increased FCC scrutiny of LMAs prompted Gray to shut down KHAS. KSNB's MyNetworkTV and MeTV programming moved to its second digital subcarrier, as well as a third digital channel on KOLN and KGIN, with all channels being broadcast in high definition. Over-the-air viewers actually benefited from the switch, as it gave NBC a full-market affiliate for the first time ever. For most of the broadcasting era, WOWT in Omaha (a sister station to KSNB and KOLN/KGIN) had doubled as Lincoln's NBC affiliate as well.

On October 20, 2017, the broadcast tower for K18CD-D, which was shared with Fox affiliate KFXL-TV (channel 51), collapsed, rendering the translator out of commission. On May 18, 2018, the call letters were changed to KCWH-LD. It returned to the air on September 26, 2018, transmitting from the KOLN studios; on October 1, Gray announced that KCWH had become the market's CW affiliate, and would be simulcast on subchannels of KNHL in Hastings and KIIT-CD in North Platte. CW programming had previously been seen over the air in Lincoln on KCWL-TV (now KFXL-TV) from 2006 through 2009; in the interim, cable systems in the market carried either KXVO from Omaha or the national CW Plus feed for CW programming. In addition to The CW, Ion is carried on KCWH's second digital subchannel.

Subchannels
The station's digital signal is multiplexed:

References

External links

The CW affiliates
Ion Television affiliates
Low-power television stations in the United States
CWH-LD
Television channels and stations established in 1999
1999 establishments in Nebraska
Gray Television